Get On Your Knees may refer to:

Music
 Get on Your Knees, a 2001 album by Reverend Beat-Man and the Un-Believers

 "Get On Your Knees", a song by Nicki Minaj and Ariana Grande from the album The Pinkprint, 2014
 "Get On Your Knees", a song by Age Against the Machine from the album Voices: WWE The Music, Vol. 9, 2011
 "Get On Your Knees", a 1968 song by Los Canarios

Theater
 Get On Your Knees, a 2019 one-person play by Jacqueline Novak